Tipchi is a village located in Burra district region of Ningi, Bauchi State, Nigeria. It has a postal code 742102. The village is a home settlement of the Yipchi community and is one of the historical places in Bauchi State. The popular historical house of Tipchi House is situated in this village.

See also
Ningi, Nigeria
Jama'are River

References

Local Government Areas in Bauchi State